Marne is an unincorporated community in Wright Township of Ottawa County in the U.S. state of Michigan.

Geography 

The Marne ZIP code 49435 serves areas in southern and eastern Wright Township, as well as areas of central Tallmadge Township to the south and small areas of Alpine Township to the east in Kent County.

Township offices are located in the community.

History 
Marne was originally called Berlin due to the many German settlers in the area. It received a post office in 1852 and was platted in 1857. Due to anti-German sentiments during World War I, the name was changed in 1919 to Marne, to honor those soldiers who fought in the Second Battle of the Marne. However, the name Berlin continues to manifest in many ways, including Berlin Baptist Church, the Berlin Fairgrounds, Berlin Fair Drive and the Berlin Raceway, where Johnny Benson Jr. raced.

Marne (at the time Berlin) also served as a stop on the historic Grand Rapids, Grand Haven & Muskegon interurban railroad.  The depot still remains to this day, although it serves as a restaurant now.
 
Ed Cole, an automotive executive for General Motors, was born in Marne, where his father was a dairy farmer.

Marne serves as a trailhead for the Musketawa Trail.

Demographics 
According to the 2011 US Census Bureau, the total population was 3,177. The median age was 42.8 and the percentage of high school graduates and higher was 91%. The median house value in 2011 was $177,300 while the median household income was $64,245. 6.8% of the population was below the poverty line in 2011.

Education
The Kenowa Hills Public Schools serves Marne. Marne Elementary School was formerly located in Marne.

References 

Unincorporated communities in Ottawa County, Michigan
Unincorporated communities in Michigan
1857 establishments in Michigan
Populated places established in 1857